Giorgi Tsintsadze is a Georgian professional basketball player for BC TSU Tbilisi of the Georgian Superliga. Giorgi is native of Tbilisi, the capital of Georgia. He is also a member of the Georgian national basketball team since 2004.

Professional career
He has played for CSKA Moscow and Dynamo Moscow prior to transferring to Rock Tartu in Estonia. In 2009, after three successful seasons in Tartu, he signed with the Greek League team AS Trikala 2000. Trikala released him on 11 December 2009 upon his own request. He then moved to Ukrainian SuperLeague team BC Donetsk. After the team bankrupted Tsindsadze went to Poland in March 2010 and signed for Trefl Sopot until the end of the season. For the 2010–11 season he returned to Estonia to play for Tartu Ülikool/Rock. Tsintsadze then went to his native Georgia for one season. In 2012 he signed with Budivelnyk Kiev of the Ukrainian SuperLeague. In September 2013, he returned to his former team BC Donetsk. In the summer 2014, Tsintsadze signed with Macedonian basketball team MZT Skopje. On 31 October 2014 he parted ways with MZT. In November 2014, he returned to Georgia and signed with MIA Academy for the rest of the season. On 15 September 2015 he signed with French club BCM Gravelines. In December 2015, he left Gravelines. On 4 January 2016 he signed with Rouen Métropole Basket for the rest of the 2015–16 LNB Pro A season.

Honours and titles
2003–04 Russian Basketball Super League (CSKA Moscow)
2005–06 ULEB Cup (Dynamo Moscow)
2006–07 Estonian League (Tartu Ülikool/Rock)
2007–08 Estonian League (Tartu Ülikool/Rock)
2010–11 BBL Cup (Tartu Ülikool/Rock)
2010–11 Estonian Cup (Tartu Ülikool/Rock)
2012–13 Ukrainian Basketball SuperLeague (BC Budivelnyk)

References

External links
Eurobasket.com profile 
Euroleague.net profile
FIBA.com profile 
Interview for Eurocup

1986 births
Living people
BC Budivelnyk players
BC Donetsk players
BC Dynamo Moscow players
BC Samara players
BCM Gravelines players
Expatriate basketball people from Georgia (country) in France
Expatriate basketball people from Georgia (country) in Greece
Expatriate basketball people from Georgia (country) in Estonia
Expatriate basketball people from Georgia (country) in Poland
Expatriate basketball people from Georgia (country) in Russia
Expatriate basketball people from Georgia (country) in Ukraine
Greek Basket League players
KK MZT Skopje players
Korvpalli Meistriliiga players
Men's basketball players from Georgia (country)
PBC CSKA Moscow players
PBC Ural Great players
Point guards
Basketball players from Tbilisi
Tartu Ülikool/Rock players
Trefl Sopot players
Trikala B.C. players
Expatriate basketball people from Georgia (country) in North Macedonia
Expatriate basketball people from Georgia (country) in Tunisia
Expatriate basketball people from Georgia (country) in Romania